Thon may refer to:

*Thon (mythology), a figure from Greek mythology
Thon (name), a surname and given name
Thon (river), northern France
Thon (A Canticle for Leibowitz), an academic rank similar to a university "don" in the science fiction novel A Canticle for Leibowitz
-thon, -athon, or -a-thon, a generic suffix and back-formation from marathon, usually used for fundraising events
Telethon, a televised fundraising event
Walkathon, a fundraising event involving walking
"Thon", proposed third-person singular gender-neutral pronoun

See also

Than (disambiguation)
Thou (disambiguation)
Thun (disambiguation)
Tron (disambiguation)